Rosencrantz and Guildenstern, A Tragic Episode, in Three Tabloids is a short comic play by W. S. Gilbert, a parody of Hamlet by William Shakespeare. The main characters in Gilbert's play are King Claudius and Queen Gertrude of Denmark, their son Prince Hamlet, the courtiers Rosencrantz and Guildenstern, and Ophelia.

Gilbert's play first appeared in Fun magazine in 1874 after having been rejected for production by several theatre companies. The first performance of the work was not until June 1891, a benefit matinée at the Vaudeville Theatre in London. The play finally ran at the Court Theatre from 27 April 1892 to 15 July, about 77 performances, with Decima Moore as Ophelia, Brandon Thomas as Claudius and Weedon Grossmith as Hamlet. An amateur performance in 1900 featured P. G. Wodehouse as Guildenstern. The play also enjoyed a production in New York City at the Murray Hill Theatre in 1900. A charity performance in 1902 featured Gilbert himself as Claudius, with Nancy McIntosh as Gertrude. Gilbert again played Claudius at a charity performance in 1904 at the Garrick Theatre (also featuring Clo Graves, Francis Burnand, Edward Rose, Paul Rubens, Lady Colin Campbell, Madeleine Lucette Ryley, Col. Newnham Davis, Alfred Sutro and Capt. Robert Marshall), and in a 1908 revival at the Lyceum Theatre starring Marion Terry.

A televised performance of the play was given in 1938 with Grahame Clifford as Claudius, Erik Chitty as Guildenstern, Leonard Sachs as Rosencrantz, and Peter Ridgeway as Hamlet. The play continues to receive occasional productions. It figures in the plot of the 2009 film Rosencrantz and Guildenstern Are Undead.

Background

1874 was a busy year for Gilbert. He illustrated The Piccadilly Annual; supervised a revival of Pygmalion and Galatea; and, besides Rosencrantz and Guildenstern, he wrote Charity; a play about the redemption of a fallen woman; a dramatisation of Ought We to Visit Her? (a novel by Annie Edwardes), an adaptation from the French, Committed for Trial, another adaptation from the French called The Blue-Legged Lady, a play, Sweethearts, and Topsyturveydom, a comic opera. He also wrote a Bab-illustrated story called "The Story of a Twelfth Cake" for the Graphic Christmas number.

Gilbert first shopped the script for Rosencrantz and Guildenstern in early 1874 to Henry Irving, who showed interest but became busy with other projects. He next offered it to William Montague at the Globe Theatre, and Montague also expressed interest but later became unavailable. Gilbert next tried his friend Marie Litton and her Court Theatre company. Failing to find a producer, he published the piece in Fun, even though he was unhappy at Funs choice of a new editor to succeed the ailing Tom Hood.

Of Gilbert's acting in the role of Claudius in 1904, The Times wrote: "His Claudius was certainly admirable.  He would play Claudius in Hamlet finely, only the part would give him no chance of making the 'points' he makes so well."

Synopsis
Tableau I
In blank verse, King Claudius of Denmark confesses to his wife, Queen Gertrude, a secret crime of his youth: not that of killing anyone; rather, he was guilty of writing a five-act tragedy.  The tragedy closed halfway through the first act as a result of derisive laughter from the audience.  The humiliated Claudius decreed that anyone who mentions the play must be executed.  The king puns: "The play was not good – but the punishment  of those that laughed at it was capital."  The queen counsels Claudius to forget about it and steers the conversation to the problem at hand: Prince Hamlet, a philosopher whose sanity is in doubt ("Opinion is divided....  Some [say] that he's really sane, but shamming mad"), suffers from an alarming "tendency to long soliloquy".  To cheer him up, she has sent for Rosencrantz and Guildenstern to divert her son with merriment. Perhaps they will also cheer the king.

Unfortunately, Rosencrantz is in love with Hamlet's fiancée, Ophelia. She joins in their plan to break her unwanted engagement to the mercurial prince:  Guildenstern and Rosencrantz will trick Hamlet into playing Claudius' tragedy before the king and thereby incur death.  The only surviving copy of the play is in the study of Ophelia's father, the Lord Chamberlain (the state censor). Ophelia is confident that she can steal it – her father sleeps very soundly after reading all the "rubbishing" new plays all day.

Tableau II
Rosencrantz and Guildenstern tell the Queen that they will have Hamlet play a leading part in some court theatricals to distract him. Hamlet enters, and she begs them to prevent him from soliloquising. Hamlet begins, "To be – or not to be," but they interrupt him, turning the soliloquy into a trio, and urging him to commit suicide. Hamlet responds: "It must be patent to the merest dunce / Three persons can't soliloquize at once!"

Ophelia is terrified by the ghosts from "five thousand plays" that haunt her father's study, "chattering forth the scenes [that her] poor father wisely had cut out". But she manages to remove the manuscript. The conspirators show Hamlet the five-act tragedy "Gonzago" (without revealing its authorship). They use reverse psychology, urging him not to produce it. They tell him that it is too long and all the parts are insignificant except his own – "A mad Archbishop who becomes a Jew to spite his diocese" and is forced to murder and soliloquise throughout the work. Hamlet insists on performing the tragedy. Thus, the play within a play becomes a trap for Hamlet (rather than Claudius).

Tableau III

Rosencrantz tells the king and queen that Hamlet has chosen a tragedy but intends to play it for laughs. Before the play begins, Hamlet instructs his players on his (and W. S. Gilbert's) theory of comic acting: 
"I hold that there is no such antick fellow as your bombastical hero who doth so earnestly spout forth his folly as to make his hearers believe that he is unconscious of all incongruity".

The First Player responds indignantly that the actors know their craft.  King Claudius and his court attend the performance, and soon the audience is roaring with laughter, except for Claudius, who realises that it is his own banned play.  Claudius condemns Hamlet to death.  Ophelia suggests that instead of killing the prince, the King should banish him to "Engle-land", where "dwell a cultured race".  Claudius assents, commenting, "They're welcome to his philosophic brain."  Hamlet is banished, and Rosencrantz embraces Ophelia.

See also
 Rosencrantz and Guildenstern
 Rosencrantz and Guildenstern Are Dead
 Rosencrantz and Guildenstern Are Undead

External links
 Synopsis of the play at the G&S Archive, with links to the script and contemporary reviews

Notes

References
 
 
 
 
 Evans, Morgan.  "Parodies of Hamlet: Truth in Bias and Stillness in Motion" – Paper comparing Gilbert's version, the original, and Last Action Hero.

1891 plays
Plays and musicals based on Hamlet
Plays by W. S. Gilbert
Plays set in Denmark